This is a chronological list of live performances by Alfredo Rossi from 1919 to 1983. The list is incomplete because no concerts without references are listed.

1919 
 17 March - Rehearsal at the Conservatory "Giuseppe Verdi", Milan, Italy.

1920 
 22 March - Rehearsal at the Conservatory "Giuseppe Verdi", Milan, Italy.

1921 
 24 May - Rehearsal at the Conservatory "Giuseppe Verdi", Milan, Italy.

1926 
 2 February - Conservatory "Giuseppe Verdi", Milan, Italy, with Umberto Rossi (cellist).

1927 
 23 November - Conservatory "Giuseppe Verdi", Milan, Italy, with Umberto Rossi (cellist).

1929 
 24 February - Conservatory "Giuseppe Verdi", Milan, Italy, with Eliane Rossi (soprano).

1930 
 25 May - Rehearsal at the Conservatory "Giuseppe Verdi", Milan, Italy.

1931 
 29 May - Rehearsal at the Conservatory "Giuseppe Verdi", Milan, Italy.

1933 
 12 May - Conservatory "Giuseppe Verdi", Milan, Italy, with Vincenzo Ricci (violinist).
 15 November - Conservatory "Giuseppe Verdi", Milan, Italy, with Renato Carenzio (violinist).

1934 
 5 March - G.U.F. headquarters, Milan, Italy.
 10 April - Conservatory "Giuseppe Verdi", Milan, Italy, with  Dorotea Quinci (soprano), Renato Carenzio (violinist) and Antonio Janigro (cellist).
 23 April - Conservatory "Giuseppe Verdi", Milan, Italy, with Celeste Gandolfi (harpist), Renato Carenzio (violinist) and Antonio Janigro (cellist).
 3 July - Palazzo Chigi-Saracini, Siena, Italy with Elsa Allodi (violinist), Ines Maria Ferraris and the female choir of La Scala.

1935 
 28 January - Conservatory "Giuseppe Verdi", Milan, Italy, with Carlo Felice Cillario (violinist) and Angelo Parigi (tenor).
 2 August - Concert at the Italian radio with Antonio Janigro, broadcast for the cities of Milan, Turin, Genoa, Florence, Trieste and Rome.
 4 December - Conservatory "Giuseppe Verdi", Milan, Italy, with Andor Dula (violinist).

1936 
 16 February - Circolo Filologico Milanese, Milan, Italy, with Maria Fiorenza Ciampelli (soprano).
 16 March - Sforza Castle, Milan, Italy, with Paola Schmitzer (soprano) and Franco Rosati (baritone).
 24 March - Conservatory "Giuseppe Verdi", Milan, Italy, with Leni Neuenschwander (soprano), Arrigo Tassinari (flutist), Renato Carenzio (violinist), Umberto Rempi (violinist), Alessandro Poleschi (violist) and Umberto Rossi (cellist).
 3 April - Circolo Filologico Milanese, Milan, Italy, with Paola Schmitzer (soprano).
 14 December - Conservatory "Giuseppe Verdi", Milan, Italy, with Antonio Janigro (cellist).

1937 
 Unknown date - Zagreb Music Institute concert hall, Zagreb, Croatia, with Antonio Janigro.
 29 March - Salón Pietro da Cemmo, Conservatorio Luca Marenzio, Brescia, Italy, with Antonio Janigro.
 8 June - University of Milan, Milan, Italy, with Corradina Mola (harpsichordist) and Leonora Angeli-Pilis (soprano).
 21 October - Concert at the Italian radio with Antonio Janigro, broadcast for the cities of Milan, Turin, Genoa, Florence, Trieste and Rome.
 27 November - Salle Chopin-Pleyel, Paris, France, with Antonio Janigro.
 15 December - Sala del Circolo Dante Alighieri, Piazza Vittorio Emanuele (now Piazza Walther), Bolzano, Italy, with Antonio Janigro.

1938 
 1 February - Conservatory "Giuseppe Verdi", Milan, Italy, with Pierre Fournier (cellist).
 14 February - Conservatory "Giuseppe Verdi", Milan, Italy, with Pina Carmirelli (violinist).
 20 April - Concert at the Italian radio, broadcast for the cities of Milan, Turin, Genoa, Florence, Bolzano, Trieste and Rome.
 23 May - Conservatory "Giuseppe Verdi", Milan, Italy, with Elda Alberti (pianist) and Margherita Orsi (soprano).

1940 
 12 January - Conservatory "Giuseppe Verdi", Milan, Italy, with Pierre Fournier (violoncellista).
 16 January - Conservatorio Giuseppe Verdi, Turin, Italy, with Pierre Fournier.
 22 February - Dopolavoro "Il Mare Nosotro", Milan, Italy, with Jolanda Pedrazzini Alessi (violinist).
 7 May - Triennale di Milano, Milan, Italy, with Clelia Gatti Aldrovandi (harpist), Leni Neuenschwander (soprano) and Gastone Tassinari (flutist).

1941 
 21 May - Conservatory "Giuseppe Verdi", Milan, Italy, with Livia Sigalla (soprano), Cesare Ferraresi (violinist) and Luigi Casale (violoncellista).
 22 November - Conservatory "Giuseppe Verdi", Milan, Italy, with the strings orchestra of La Scala, Michelangelo Abbado (violinist), Renato Carenzio (violinist), R. Astolfi (violinist), U. Corti (violist) and Aldo Cavolla (cellist).

1945 
 12 November - Olimpia Theatre, Milan, Italy with Pina Carmirelli (violinist).

1946 
 14 April - Sforza Castle, Milan, Italy.
 31 July - Casa della Cultura, Milan, Italy with Attilio Ranzato (cellist).
 4 November - Municipal Theatre, Girona, Spain, with the Chamber Orchestra of Milan.
 8 November - San Sebastián, Spain, with the Chamber Orchestra of Milan.
 18 November - Palau de la Música Catalana, Barcelona, Spain, with the Chamber Orchestra of Milan.
 19 November - Palau de la Música Catalana, Barcelona, Spain, with the Chamber Orchestra of Milan.
 Unknown date - Sociedad Filarmónica de Bilbao, Bilbao, Spain, with the Chamber Orchestra of Milan.

1947 
 2 February - Centro Studi della Scapigliatura Milanese, Milan, Italy, with Vittorio Basevi
 21 February - Teatro Olimpia, Milan, Italy with Pierre Fournier.
 24 February - Sala Ridotto at the Teatro Lirico Giuseppe Verdi, Trieste, Italy, with Pierre Fournier (cellist).
 27 February - Angelicum Theatre, Milan, Italy, with Lorenzo Lugli (violinist), Arnaldo Zanetti (violinist), Enzo Francalanci (violist) and Pietro Nava (cellist).
 10 March - Casa della Cultura, Milan, Italy with Luisa Magenta (soprano).
 26 May - Societa' Dei Concerti, Bolzano, Italy.
 4 December - San Sebastián, Spain, with Váša Příhoda.
 12 December - Galería Condal, Barcelona, Spain, with Váša Příhoda.
 29 December - Sala del Circolo Unione, Bari, Italy, with the Chamber Orchestra of Milan.
 30 December - Sala del Circolo Unione, Bari, Italy, with the Chamber Orchestra of Milan.

1948 
 14 January - Galería Condal, Barcelona, Spain, with Enrico Mainardi.
 1 February - Palau de la Música Catalana, Barcelona, Spain, with Cesare Ferraresi.
 1 March - Sala Ridotto at the Teatro Lirico Giuseppe Verdi, Trieste, Italy, with Pierre Fournier (cellist).
 14 March - Gran Casino del Foment, Terrassa, Spain, with Riccardo Brengola.
 3 April - Conservatorio Giuseppe Verdi, Turin, Italy, with Antonio Janigro.
 19 April - Teatro del Instituto Francés, Madrid, Spain, with Pierre Fournier.
 21 April - Palau de la Música Catalana, Barcelona, Spain, with Pierre Fournier.
 30 April - Instituto Italiano de Cultura, Barcelona, Spain, with Cesare Ferraresi.
 2 May - Palau de la Música Catalana, Barcelona, Spain, with Georg Kulenkampff.
 10 May - San Sebastián, Spain, with Georg Kulenkampff.
 19 May - Palau de la Música Catalana, Barcelona, Spain, with Georg Kulenkampff.
 2 June - Galería Condal, Barcelona, Spain, with Georg Kulenkampff.
 20 October - San Sebastián, Spain, with Franco Gulli.
 5 November - Teatro Filarmónica, Oviedo, Spain, with Franco Gulli.
 10 November - Teatro Calderón, Barcelona, Spain, with Franco Gulli.
 23 November - San Sebastián, Spain, with Ida Haendel.
 17 November - Diligentia Theatre, The Hague, Netherlands, with Antonio Janigro.

1949 
 20 January - Palau de la Música Catalana, Barcelona, Spain, with Virginia Paris.
 21 January - Palau de la Música Catalana, Barcelona, Spain, with Virginia Paris.
 21 March - Palau de la Música Catalana, Barcelona, Spain, with Dimitry Markevitch.
 4 April - Palau de la Música Catalana, Barcelona, Spain, with Mascia Predit.
 9 May - Conservatorio de Música "Manuel de Falla", Cádiz, Spain, with Gaspar Cassadó.
 8 June - San Sebastián, Spain, with Gaspar Cassadó.
 15 June - Palau de la Música Catalana, Barcelona, Spain, with Gaspar Cassadó.
 10 October - San Sebastián, Spain, with Ida Haendel.
 17 October - Teatro Principal, Valencia, Spain, with Ida Haendel.
 30 November - San Sebastián, Spain, with Enrico Mainardi.

1950 
 24 February - Teatro Filarmónica, Oviedo, Spain, with Wanda Luzzato.
 Unknown date - Instituto de Cultura Italiana, Madrid, Spain, with Wanda Luzzato.
 20 April - Instituto de Cultura Italiana, Madrid, Spain.
 8 May - Municipal Theatre, Rio de Janeiro, Brazil, with Pierre Fournier.
 11 May - Municipal Theatre, Rio de Janeiro, Brazil, with Pierre Fournier.
 13 July - Concert at the Italian radio with Dimitry Markevitch.
 14 July - Concert at the Italian radio with Dimitry Markevitch.
 30 October - Palau de la Música Catalana, Barcelona, Spain, with Pierre Fournier.
 31 October - Palau de la Música Catalana, Barcelona, Spain, with Pierre Fournier.
 December - Madrid, Spain, with André Navarra.

1951 
 11 January - Instituto de Cultura Italiana, Madrid, Spain.
 28 February - Palau de la Música Catalana, Barcelona, Spain, with Bernard Michelin.
 8 March - Gran Teatre del Liceu, Barcelona, Spain, with Camilla Wicks.
 7 August - Municipal Theatre, Rio de Janeiro, Brazil, with Pierre Fournier.
 25 October - Santa Isabel Theatre, Recife, Brazil, with Ida Haendel.
 27 October - Santa Isabel Theatre, Recife, Brazil, with Ida Haendel.
 29 October - Municipal Theatre, Rio de Janeiro, Brazil, with Ida Haendel.
 4 November - Municipal Theatre, Niterói, Brazil, with Ida Haendel.
 6 November - Municipal Theatre, Rio de Janeiro, Brazil, with Ida Haendel.

1952 
 8 August - Teatro Colón, Buenos Aires, Argentina, with Victoria de los Ángeles.
 1 October - Teatro Cultura Artística, São Paulo, Brazil, with Renato de Barbieri.
 2 October - Teatro Cultura Artística, São Paulo, Brazil, with Renato de Barbieri.
 6 October - Municipal Theatre São Paulo, Brazil, with Renato de Barbieri.

1953 
 7 July - Municipal Theatre, São Paulo, Brazil, with Ruggiero Ricci.
 18 July - Santa Isabel Theatre, Recife, Brazil, with Ruggiero Ricci.
 20 July - Santa Isabel Theatre, Recife, Brazil, with Ruggiero Ricci.
 29 July - Municipal Theatre, Rio de Janeiro, Brazil, with Ida Haendel.
 7 August - Santa Isabel Theatre, Recife, Brazil, with Ida Haendel.
 8 August - Santa Isabel Theatre, Recife, Brazil, with Ida Haendel.
 10 August - Santa Isabel Theatre, Recife, Brazil, with Ida Haendel.
 18 August - Teatro São Pedro, São Paulo, Brazil, with Ida Haendel.
 5 September - Municipal Theatre, Rio de Janeiro, Brazil, with Ricardo Odnoposoff.
 27 September - Municipal Theatre, Rio de Janeiro, Brazil, with Erno Valasek.
 13 November - San Sebastián, Spain, with Wanda Lazzato.
 19 November - Teatro Principal de Pontevedra, Pontevedra, Spain, with Wanda Lazzato.
 9 December - San Sebastián, Spain, with Erno Valasek.

1954 
 22 January - Conservatory "Giuseppe Verdi", Milan, Italy, with Erno Valasek (violinist).
 1 February - Teatro Principal, Valencia, Spain, with Ida Haendel.
 10 February - Assembly Rooms, Gibraltar, with Ida Haendel.
 15 February - San Sebastián, Spain, with Ida Haendel.
 7 March - Sociedad Filarmónica de Bilbao, Bilbao, Spain, with Alfredo Campoli.
 13 March - Sabada, Spain, with Alfredo Campoli.
 17 March - Bilbao, Spain, with Alfredo Campoli.
 29 March - Bilbao, Spain, with Alfredo Campoli.
 31 March - Santander, Spain, with Alfredo Campoli.
 2 April - San Sebastián, Spain, with Alfredo Campoli.
 8 April - Palau de la Música Catalana, Barcelona, Spain, with Alfredo Campoli.
 5 May - Sociedad Filarmónica de Bilbao, Bilbao, Spain, with Elisabeth Schwarzkopf.
 6 May - San Sebastián, Spain, with Elisabeth Schwarzkopf.
 16 May - Teatro Nacional de São Carlos, Lisboa, Portugal, with Elisabeth Schwarzkopf.
 5 September - Municipal Theatre, Rio de Janeiro, Brazil, with Ricardo Odnoposoff.
 7 September - Concert at the Brazilian radio Jornal do Brasil, Brazil, with Ricardo Odnoposoff.
 9 September - Auditorium at the Pontificia Universidade do Rio Grande do Sul, São Paulo, Brazil, with Ricardo Odnoposoff.
 25 September - Municipal Theatre, Santiago de Chile, Chile, with Victoria de los Ángeles.
 Unknown date - Montevideo, Uruguay, with Victoria de los Ángeles.

1955 
 18 April - Santa Isabel Theatre, Recife, Brazil, with Ruben Varga.
 3 May - Municipal Theatre, Rio de Janeiro, Brazil, with Ruben Varga.
 28 October - Auditorium Theatre, La Habana, Cuba, with Victoria de los Ángeles.
 29 October - Auditorium Theatre, La Habana, Cuba, with Victoria de los Ángeles.
 2 December - San Sebastián, Spain, with Wanda Luzzato.

1956 
 23 January - San Sebastián, Spain, with Sirio Piovesan.
 22 February - Palau de la Música Catalana, Barcelona, Spain, with Ivry Gitlis.
 8 March - Hotel Castellana Hilton, Madrid, Spain, with Ruggiero Ricci.
 25 April - Palazzo Serbelloni, Milan, Italy, with Marco Granchi (violinist).
 2 June - Buenos Aires, Argentina, with Alfredo Campoli.
 9 June - Buenos Aires, Argentina, with Alfredo Campoli.
 17 June - Municipal Theatre, Santiago de Chile, Chile, with Alfredo Campoli.
 9 July - Solís Theatre, Montevideo, Uruguay, with Alfredo Campoli.
 17 July - Santa Fé, Argentina, with Alfredo Campoli.
 23 July - Municipal Theatre São Paulo, Brazil, with Alfredo Campoli.
 24 July - Salvador de Bahia, Brazil, with Alfredo Campoli.
 30 July - Pernambuco, Brazil, with Alfredo Campoli.
 6 August - Teatro Monumental, Buenos Aires, Argentina, with Gloria Davy.
 7 August - Teatro Monumental, Buenos Aires, Argentina, with Gloria Davy.
 20 November - Willemstad, Curaçao, with Christian Ferras.
 26 November - Municipal Theatre, Rio de Janeiro, Brazil, with Christian Ferras.
 28 November - Municipal Theatre São Paulo, Brazil, with Christian Ferras.
 30 November - Municipal Theatre São Paulo, Brazil, with Christian Ferras.

1957 
 3 June - Municipal Theatre, Rio de Janeiro, Brazil, with Pierre Fournier.
 6 June - Municipal Theatre São Paulo, Brazil, with Pierre Fournier.
 10 June - Auditorio do Colegio Estadual do Paraná, Curitiba, Brasil, with Pierre Fournier.
 Unknown date - National Museum of Decorative Arts, Buenos Aires, Argentina, with Pierre Fournier.

1958 
 28 May - Municipal Theatre, Rio de Janeiro, Brazil, with Antonio Janigro.
 4 June - Auditorio do Colegio Estadual do Paraná, Curitiba, Brazil, with Antonio Janigro.
 25 October - Centro Cultural La Comuna, La Plata, Argentina with Noemí Souza.

1959 
 25 May - Municipal Theatre, Rio de Janeiro, Brazil, with Ida Haendel.
 25 August - Municipal Theatre, Rio de Janeiro, Brazil, with Lawrence Winters.
 31 August - Santa Isabel Theatre, Recife, Brazil, with Lawrence Winters.

1960 
 19 January - Liceo Clásico Pietro Verri, Lodi, Italy, with Ivry Gitlis.
 20 March - St. Xavier's Institution, Penang, Malaysia, with Bernard Michelin.
 23 March - Victoria Theatre, Singapore, with Bernard Michelin.
 24 March - Victoria Theatre, Singapore, with Bernard Michelin.
 30 March - Victoria Theatre, Singapore, with Bernard Michelin.
 2 May - Concert at the Singapore radio with Bernard Michelin.
 29 May - ABC Hall, Osaka, Japan, with Bernard Michelin.
 Unknown date - Federico Santa María Technical University, Valparaíso, Chile, with Bernard Michelin.

1961 
 Unknown date - Teatro Odeón, Buenos Aires, Argentina, with Janine Andrade.

1962 
 9 Jun - Teatro Colón, Buenos Aires, Argentina, with Victoria de los Ángeles.

1963 
 Unknown date - National Museum of Decorative Arts, Buenos Aires, Argentina, with Salvatore Accardo.
 Unknown date - National Museum of Decorative Arts, Buenos Aires, Argentina, with Peter-Lukas Graf.
 Unknown date - Teatro General San Martín, Buenos Aires, Argentina, with Anahí Carfi.

1965 
 11 September - Teatro Colón, Buenos Aires, Argentina, with Montserrat Caballé.

1966 
 May - Teatro Colón, Buenos Aires, Argentina, with Salvatore Accardo.
 12 June - Municipal Theatre, Santiago de Chile, Chile, with Salvatore Accardo.

1967 
 Unknown date - Teatro General San Martín, Buenos Aires, Argentina, with Ruben Gonzalez.

1969 
 April - Santa Fé, Argentina with Szymsia Bajour.
 23 June - Auditorio da Reitoria da Universidade Federal do Paraná, Curitiba, Brazil, with Salvatore Accardo.
 30 June - Concert at the TV Globo/Radio MEC, Rio de Janeiro, Brazil, with Salvatore Accardo.
 14 September - Teatro Colón, Buenos Aires, Argentina, with Agustín León Ara.

1970 
 26 May - Auditorio Italia, São Paulo, Brasil, with Uto Ughi.
 July - Teatro Colón, Buenos Aires, Argentina, with Uto Ughi.

1972 
 1 July - Teatro Colón, Buenos Aires, Argentina, with Salvatore Accardo.

1973 
 21 May - Teatro Municipal, São Paulo, Brasil, with Antonio Janigro.
 23 May - Sala Cecilia Meireles, Rio de Janeiro, Brazil, with Antonio Janigro.
 30 May - Sala Cecilia Meireles, Rio de Janeiro, Brazil, with Antonio Janigro.
 11 June - Municipal Theatre São Paulo, Brazil, with Antonio Janigro.

1974 
 30 May - Municipal Theatre São Paulo, Brazil, with Salvatore Accardo.
 31 May - Municipal Theatre São Paulo, Brazil, with Salvatore Accardo.
 4 June - Sala Cecilia Meireles, Rio de Janeiro, Brazil, with Salvatore Accardo.

1975 
 Unknown date - Teatro Coliseo, Buenos Aires, Argentina, with Pierre Fournier.

1976 
 28 June - Sala Cecilia Meireles, Rio de Janeiro, Brazil, with Andre Navarra.

1978 
 11 September - Municipal Theatre São Paulo, Brazil, with Andre Navarra.

1983 
 21 September - Teatro Coliseo, Buenos Aires, Argentina, with Ana Chumachenco.

References 

Chamber music